Gemma Dudley (born 8 March 1990) is a New Zealand female  track cyclist. She competed in the omnium event at the 2010 UCI Track Cycling World Championships and in the scratch event at the 2012 UCI Track Cycling World Championships.

References

External links
 
 
 
 
 

1990 births
Living people
New Zealand track cyclists
New Zealand female cyclists
Place of birth missing (living people)
Cyclists at the 2010 Commonwealth Games
Commonwealth Games competitors for New Zealand